Constructor Quarterly is a quarterly British magazine aimed at Meccano enthusiasts.  It was founded in 1988.

It is published in Sheffield in the UK by RJ Publications.  It consists mainly of photos and descriptions of Meccano models made by the Meccano enthusiasts community.  It also features news and comment on the subject of Meccano.

References

External links
Constructor Quarterly (official site)

Quarterly magazines published in the United Kingdom
Hobby magazines published in the United Kingdom
Magazines established in 1988
Mass media in Sheffield